Kixmiller's Store was a historic commercial building located at Freelandville in Widner Township, Knox County, Indiana.  Built in 1866 and expanded in 1878, it was a two-story, block long, brick building containing four storefronts. The building measured 140 feet by 108 feet by 135 feet.  Its architecture reflected some Italianate style design influences.  It was added to the National Register of Historic Places in 1978.

Kixmiller's was demolished by its owner on February 20, 2017, as structural deterioration had left it in a dangerous and irreparable state.

References

Commercial buildings on the National Register of Historic Places in Indiana
Italianate architecture in Indiana
Commercial buildings completed in 1878
Buildings and structures in Knox County, Indiana
National Register of Historic Places in Knox County, Indiana
Demolished buildings and structures in Indiana
Buildings and structures demolished in 2017